The following are the licensed milk processing companies in Uganda. The list is not exhaustive.

See also
 Agriculture in Uganda
 Dairy industry in Uganda

References

External links
Uganda milk exports make good inroads into Kenya As of 2 May 2018.
Opportunities and challenges in Uganda's dairy industry
Firms scale up investment in milk processing

Dairy products companies of Uganda
Milk